Thorleif Haug (28 September 1894 – 12 December 1934) was a Norwegian skier who competed in nordic combined and cross-country. At the 1924 Olympics he won all three Nordic skiing events (18 km, 50 km and combined). He was also awarded the bronze medal in ski jumping, but 50 years later a mistake was found in calculation of scores, Haug was demoted to fourth place, and his daughter presented her father's medal to Anders Haugen.

Biography
Thorleif Haug was born in Vivelstad, a narrow valley between the Lier Lier, Drammen in Buskerud county, Norway. He was raised on the Årkvisla farm.

Dominating  Nordic combined  and  cross-country skiing  events during the 1920s, he won three gold medals in the first Winter Olympics in Chamonix and was fourth in ski jumping. In addition, he won the 50 kilometres cross-country event at the Holmenkollen ski festival a record six times (1918–1921, 1923–1924) and the Nordic combined three times (1919–21). Haug shared the Holmenkollen medal in 1919 with fellow Norwegian Otto Aasen. Haug also won a silver in the Nordic combined at the 1926 FIS Nordic World Ski Championships in Lahti. Haug represented his club, SBK Drafn, Drammen.

Haug worked as a plumber after his sporting career, and died of pneumonia in 1934, 40 years old.

Legacy
In 1946, a statue of Thorleif Haug by Norwegian sculptor Per Palle Storm was erected in Drammen. A road in the Voksenkollen area in Oslo was named after Haug during 1952. Since 1966, his skiing club has  held a Memorial Race in his name (Thorleif Haugs Minneløp) as a part of the Thorleif Haug Ski Festival (Thorleif Haug Skifestival). The race runs from Geithus to Drammen, encompassing Haug's home at Årkvisla. Drammen has an illuminated track along Bragernesåsen named Thorleif Haug's way. Thorleif Haug Lodge  was officially established 21 January 1984, as the fifth lodge of the Sons of Norway in Norway.

Cross-country skiing results
All results are sourced from the International Ski Federation (FIS).

Olympic Games
 2 medals – (2 gold)

See also
List of multiple Summer Olympic medalists

References

External links

 . Cross-country profile
 . Nordic combined profile
 Holmenkollen medalists – click Holmenkollmedaljen for downloadable pdf file 
 Holmenkollen winners since 1892 – click Vinnere for downloadable pdf file 
 Thorleif Haug Skifestival

1894 births
1934 deaths
Cross-country skiers at the 1924 Winter Olympics
Sportspeople from Drammen
Deaths from pneumonia in Norway
Holmenkollen medalists
Holmenkollen Ski Festival winners
Nordic combined skiers at the 1924 Winter Olympics
Norwegian male Nordic combined skiers
Olympic Nordic combined skiers of Norway
Norwegian male cross-country skiers
Olympic cross-country skiers of Norway
Olympic gold medalists for Norway
Olympic ski jumpers of Norway
Ski jumpers at the 1924 Winter Olympics
Olympic medalists in cross-country skiing
Olympic medalists in Nordic combined
FIS Nordic World Ski Championships medalists in Nordic combined
Medalists at the 1924 Winter Olympics
People from Lier, Norway